Fugitivos is a Colombian drama television series that premiered on Caracol Televisión on August 4, 2014, and concluded on October 3, 2014. Created by Clara María Ochoa inspired on the 1997 Colombian telenovela La mujer del presidente, and produced by CMO Producciones and distributed by Caracol Internacional. The series is available in 4K Ultra-high-definition television. It stars Emmanuel Esparza and Taliana Vargas.

Plot 
Julián (Emmanuel Esparza) is an engineer who sees his life, his marriage and his work destroyed overnight, as he is blamed for a murder he did not commit. After being sentenced to 26 years in prison, he decides to escape to find the only witness who really knows who is the real culprit of the crime. However, in jail he meets Esperanza (Taliana Vargas) and in her he finds love again.

Cast 
 Emmanuel Esparza as Julián Duarte
 Taliana Vargas as Esperanza Gómez
 José Narváez as Ricardo Pradilla
 María José Martínez as Mariana Cárdenas
 Christian Tappan as Steve Houston
 Endry Cardeño as Vladimir Mendoza
 Jorge Soto as Carlos Alberto
 Marcela Agudelo as Patricia Rodríguez
 Alex Letón as Johnny Masson
 Mario Jurado as Hernán Sierra
 Alejandra Miranda as La Coyote
 Alma Rodríguez as Lorena Pineda
 Constanza Hernández as Maribel Pardo
 Juan Diego Sánchez as Sergio Caviedes
 Jóse Pedraza as Teniente Morales
 Alex Adames as Agente Torres
 Juan Esteban Aponte as Samuel Duarte
 Yuly Pedraza as Melba
 Dave Thomas as Plummer

Rating

Hindi version 
Fugitivos is dubbed in Hindi language under the title "Faraar" and its available in parts/episodes on YouTube.

References

External links 
 

Colombian drama television series
Caracol Televisión original programming
2014 Colombian television series debuts
2014 Colombian television series endings
Spanish-language television shows
Television shows set in Bogotá